Qualea parviflora, known as pau-terra in Portuguese, is a deciduous tree indigenous to Bolivia, Brazil, and Paraguay. The tree favors dry climates like the tropical savanna of the cerrado.

Description
It flowers between September and December. Each flower as one light purple petal, a single stamen, a spurred calyx, and a three-parted ovary. Pau-terra can be distinguished from a close relative Qualea multiflora by its smaller flowers.

Ecology
The flowers are pollinated by bees. The seeds are eaten by buprestid beetles and small Hymenoptera species. Caterpillars of the dalcerid moth Dalcera abrasa feed on Quaela parviflora.

References

parviflora
Plants described in 1826